The 1937 PGA Championship was the 20th PGA Championship, held May 24–30 at Pittsburgh Field Club in Fox Chapel, Pennsylvania, a suburb northeast of Pittsburgh.  Then a match play championship, Denny Shute won his second consecutive PGA Championship in less than seven months, defeating Jug McSpaden in 37 holes. The previous edition in 1936 was held in November at Pinehurst, North Carolina.

Shute was 3 holes up after the morning round of the finals, but McSpaden had the lead with nine holes remaining and was 2 up with three holes to go. McSpaden bogeyed the 34th and double-bogeyed the 35th to square up the match as they went to the 36th tee. McSpaden missed a  birdie putt to win and they halved the hole and went to an extra hole.

Shute was the last to successfully defend his title at the PGA Championship until Tiger Woods won consecutive titles in 1999 and 2000. It was Shute's third and final major title; his first was at the British Open in 1933 at St. Andrews.

Usually played later in the schedule, this PGA Championship was in late May, the first of three times it was held before the U.S. Open and British Open. Prior to World War II, the PGA Championship was most often played in September, but ranged from late May (1937, 1942) to early December (1929). Since 1969, it has been held in early to mid-August, except for 1971 (February) and 2016 (July).

Format
The match play format at the PGA Championship in 1937 called for 12 rounds (216 holes) in seven days:
 Monday and Tuesday – 36-hole stroke play qualifier, 18 holes per day;
defending champion and top 63 professionals advanced to match play
 Wednesday – first two rounds, 18 holes each
 Thursday – third round – 36 holes
 Friday – quarterfinals – 36 holes
 Saturday – semifinals – 36 holes
 Sunday – final – 36 holes

Past champions in the field

Failed to qualify

Source:

Final results
Sunday, May 30, 1937

Source:

Final eight bracket

Final match scorecards
Morning

Afternoon

^ = picked up ball (hole concession)

Extra hole

Source:

References

External links
PGA Media Guide 2012
PGA.com – 1937 PGA Championship

PGA Championship
Golf in Pittsburgh
PGA Championship
PGA Championship
PGA Championship
PGA Championship